José Luis Di Palma (born March 31, 1966), is an Argentine racing driver. He was born in Mar del Plata, Buenos Aires province.

Racing career

Early career
Di Palma began his professional career racing in the Argentine TC 2000 Championship in 1984. After three years in the series and few notabile results, Di Palma moved to formula car racing in Formula Three Sudamericana in 1987. He finished 8th in points in his rookie season and improved to 7th in 1988. He placed 9th in 1989.

Europe and Indy Lights
In 1990 Di Palma moved to Europe to race in Formula Opel Lotus Euroseries where he finished 9th. In 1991 he raced in British Formula 3000 for Cobra Motorsport and finished 11th. The series became British Formula 2 in 1991 and Di Palma finished fourth in points for AJS. Di Palma continued with the team in British F2 in 1993 and was runner-up in the championship and captured 2 wins. In 1994 he won the championship driving for Madgwick International, again capturing two wins. The series was not held in 1995 so Di Palma competed in eight races in the American Indy Lights series in 1995 for Leisy McCormack Racing. He finished 19th in points with a best finish of fifth at Toronto. He returned to Indy Lights full-time in 1996, this time driving for Tasman Motorsports. Di Palma finished 9th in points with a best finish of fourth at Belle Isle. Di Palma's Tasman teammates Tony Kanaan and Hélio Castroneves finished second and seventh in points, respectively.

Return to South America
In 1997, Di Palma competed in the South American Super Touring Car Championship and finished eighth and made four starts in Turismo Carretera. He competed in Turismo Carretera full-time in 1998 and finished seventh. In 1999 in the same series he finished fourth. Di Palma continued to race in Turismo Carretera until 2009, also finishing fourth in points in 2001, matching his career best. Di Palma also competed in the Dakar Rally across South America in 2010 and 2011.

Complete motorsports results

American Open-Wheel racing results
(key) (Races in bold indicate pole position, races in italics indicate fastest race lap)

Indy Lights

Barber Dodge Pro Series

References

External links

1966 births
Living people
Formula 3 Sudamericana drivers
Argentine racing drivers
Turismo Carretera drivers
TC 2000 Championship drivers
Top Race V6 drivers
Indy Lights drivers
British Formula 3000 Championship drivers
EFDA Nations Cup drivers
Dakar Rally drivers
Sportspeople from Mar del Plata
Barber Pro Series drivers

Tasman Motorsports drivers